Bohdan Vasylyovych Mykhaylichenko (born 21 March 1997) is a Ukrainian professional footballer who plays as a midfielder for Shakhtar Donetsk on loan from Anderlecht, and the Ukraine national team.

Career
Born in Boryspil, Kyiv Oblast, Ukraine, Mykhaylichenko is a product of the Dynamo Kyiv and Knyazha Shaslyve sportive schools. His first trainer was Oleksandr Kurylko.

Dynamo Kiev
He made his debut in the Ukrainian Premier League for Dynamo on 24 May 2015 against FC Karpaty Lviv.

Anderlecht
On 21 July 2020, acting general director of FC Zorya Luhansk, Stanyslav Ohanov, announced that Mykhaylichenko was moving to Belgian club Anderlecht on 1 August 2020. On 3 August 2020 he was officially presented as an Anderlecht player.

Shakhtar Donetsk (loan)
On 27 July 2022, Anderlecht announced that they had loaned Mykhaylichenko to Shakhtar Donetsk with an option to buy.

International career
Mykhaylichenko made his professional debut with the Ukraine in a 2-1 UEFA Nations League win over Switzerland on 3 September 2020.

Honours 
Dynamo Kyiv
Ukrainian Premier League: 2014–15

References

External links 
 
 

1997 births
Living people
People from Boryspil
Ukrainian footballers
Ukraine youth international footballers
Ukraine under-21 international footballers
Ukraine international footballers
Association football midfielders
FC Dynamo Kyiv players
FC Stal Kamianske players
FC Zorya Luhansk players
R.S.C. Anderlecht players
FC Shakhtar Donetsk players
Ukrainian Premier League players
Belgian Pro League players
Ukrainian expatriate footballers
Expatriate footballers in Belgium
Ukrainian expatriate sportspeople in Belgium
Sportspeople from Kyiv Oblast